{{DISPLAYTITLE:L-2-hydroxycarboxylate dehydrogenase (NAD+)}}

L-2-hydroxycarboxylate dehydrogenase (NAD+) ((R)-sulfolactate:NAD+ oxidoreductase, L-sulfolactate dehydrogenase, (R)-sulfolactate dehydrogenase, L-2-hydroxyacid dehydrogenase (NAD+), ComC) is an enzyme with systematic name (2S)-2-hydroxycarboxylate:NAD+ oxidoreductase. This enzyme catalyses the following chemical reaction

 (2S)-2-hydroxycarboxylate + NAD+  2-oxocarboxylate + NADH + H+

The enzyme from the archaeon Methanocaldococcus jannaschii uses as a substrate multiple (S)-2-hydroxycarboxylates including (2R)-3-sulfolactate, (S)-malate, (S)-lactate, and (S)-2-hydroxyglutarate.

References

External links 
 

EC 1.1.1